Mohammad Saiful Abedin, BSP, ndc, psc is a retired major general in the Bangladesh Army. He was General officer commanding (GOC) of the 24th Infantry Division and Area Commander, Chattogram Area. He is the former director general of DGFI. He previously served as Commandant of Defence Services Command & Staff College (DSCSC). He was also the Commandant of Bangladesh Infantry Regimental Centre (BIRC). He also served in 71 Mechanized Brigade as Commander.

Early life and education
Abedin graduated from Mirzapur Cadet College in 1984. He was selected at the ISSB for the 15th (BMA) Long Course and was commissioned in the East Bengal Regiment on 25 Dec 1986. He was awarded with the coveted 'Sword of Honour' for best all-round performance and 'Osmani Gold Medal' for best academic performance at his commission.

He obtained Bachelor of Science from Chittagong University, Masters in Defence Studies from National University of Bangladesh and Master of Business Administration from Royal Roads University, Canada. At present he is pursuing M.Phil. on Strategy and Development under Bangladesh University of Professionals and PhD on international relations under Jahangirnagar University.

Major General Abedin also received military training and education from various training institutions both at home and abroad on strategic and development studies, tactics, military science, weapon systems, UN peacekeeping operations etc. He is a graduate of Defence Service Command and Staff College, Mirpur and National Defence College of Bangladesh. He also attended training under the Infantry School of Malaysia, Defence Academy of the UK, Global Peace Operations Initiative (GPOI) and Peace Operations Training Institute.

Career
Major General Abedin has hold a variety of command, staff and instructional appointments. As a staff he served as the Grade-3 Staff Officer and Brigade Major in Infantry Brigades, Grade-1 Staff Officer at Military Operations Directorate, Army Headquarters and Headquarters, Director General of Forces Intelligence (DGFI). He was also Col GS in Headquarters, DGFI. He served in two terms in BMA as Platoon and Battalion Commander. He was also the adjutant of Mymensingh Girls’ Cadet College. He commanded a standard Infantry Battalion and a Mechanized Infantry Brigade. He retired from active service on July, 2022.

UN Mission
The General had a tour of duty as Chief of Staff, Multinational Sec HQ, West in United Nations Operation in Côte d'Ivoire (UNOCI). He also participated in United Nations Iraq-Kuwait Observation Mission (UNIKOM) as the Operations Officer of Bangladesh Contingent.

Personal life 
The General is happily married to Fatema Tuz Zohra Camellia. and the couple has one daughter and son.

References

Bangladesh Army generals
Bangladeshi generals
Directors General of the Directorate General of Forces Intelligence
Living people
1966 births